Khera Kalan is a census-designated town in the north district of the Indian territory of Delhi.

Population
In the 2011 a report published by Census India stated that Khera Kalan had 1,539 households and a total population of 11,252. This included 6,397 males and 5,855 females. There were 1,095 children between the ages of 0 and 6 which equates to 13.27% of the village population. The distribution of the population in the 2011 census was 877 adult females for every 1,000 adult males. There were 891 female children for every 1,000 male children. This is compared to the average for the larger territory of Delhi where there are 871 females for every 1,000 males.

Khera Kalan has Delhi's largest representation of Jattrana Gotra clan at over 70% of the population .The Brahmins represent 6% of the village population while Muslims represent 5% of the population. Therefore, over 80% of the village's land belongs to members of the Jattrana Gotra community. The total Scheduled Castes and Scheduled Tribes population in the town was 1,807 people and all were Scheduled Castes. There are no people belonging to Scheduled Tribes recorded in the town.

See also
Khera Kalan railway station

References

Cities and towns in North West Delhi district